The MTV Awards (known as TRL Awards from 2006 to 2012) were established in 2006 by MTV Italy, awarded to the most popular artists and music videos in Italy. Originally an annual event for the most requested videos and artists on Total Request Live, from 2013 the MTV Awards reflect what MTV Italian viewers consider the best in music, cinema and fashion.

From 2006 to 2010 the show changed its host city every year, and from 2011 to 2016 was set in Florence before moving to Rome in 2017. The awards are presented annually and broadcast live on MTV Italy, and online.

Host cities

Winners

2006 
 First Lady: Avril Lavigne
 Man of the Year: Lee Ryan
 Best Group: t.A.T.u.
 Best New Artist: Hilary Duff
 Best Number #1: Lee Ryan - "Army of Lovers"
 Best "Verrei ma non posso": Cast O.C.
 Best Cry Award: Jesse McCartney
 Best Riempi-Piazza: Gemelli DiVersi
 Best TRL City: Milano
 Best Funny Moment: Bloodhound Gang
 Italians Do It Better: Negramaro
 Miglior Cartellone: Most artistic

2007 

 First Lady: Hilary Duff
 Man of the Year: Tiziano Ferro
 Best Band: My Chemical Romance
 Best New Artist: Thirty Seconds to Mars
 Best Number #1: Finley "Diventerai una star"
 Best Cry Award: Finley
 Best Riempi-Piazza: Tiziano Ferro
 Italians Do It Better: Finley
 Best Movie: Notte prima degli esami – Oggi
 Best Live Moment: Zero Assoluto (in Siracusa)
 Best TRL History: Nek

2008 

Despite the other editions of the TRL Awards that were hosted in Milan, for this year the show was broadcast from Naples.
 First Lady: Avril Lavigne
 Man of the Year: Tiziano Ferro
 Best Band: Tokio Hotel
 Best Cartello: Matteo, Mattia, Francesca & Lorenzo – Florence Thirty Seconds to Mars
 Best New Artist: Sonohra
 Best Riempi-Piazza: Finley
 Best Movie: Come tu mi vuoi
 Best Blockbuster's Couple: Michelle Hunziker and Fabio De Luigi 
 Best TRL History: Max Pezzali
 Best Number One: Tokio Hotel – "Monsoon"

2009 

This year the show was broadcast from Trieste.
 First Lady: Hilary Duff
 Man Of The Year: Marco Carta
 Best Band: Lost
 Best Riempi-Piazza: Sonohra
 Best Cartello: Jonas Brothers
 Italians Do It Better: Gemelli Diversi
 Best Movie: Twilight
 Best Number One Of The Year: Marco Carta – "La forza mia"
 Best TRL History: Cesare Cremonini
 Best New Artist Presented By MTV Pulse: dARI
 Best Event In Milan: Jonas Brothers
 Playlist Generation: #1 Thirty Seconds to Mars – "A Beautiful Lie"

2010 

For the fifth edition, the show was broadcast from Genoa.
 Best New Generation: Broken Heart College
 Best International Act: Justin Bieber
 Best Look: dARI
 Best Movie: Avatar
 Best Fan Club: Lost
 My TRL Best Video: Valerio Scanu – "Per tutte le volte che..."
 Best TRL History: J Ax
 MTV First Lady: Malika Ayane
 MTV Man of the Year: Marco Mengoni
 MTV Best Band: Muse

2011 

In 2011 the show was broadcast from Florence.
 Best Look: Avril Lavigne
 Best MTV Show: I soliti idioti
 Best New act: Modà
 Hot&sexy Award: Robert Pattinson
 Too Much Award: Ligabue
 Wonder Woman Award: Lady Gaga
 Superman Award: Fabri Fibra
 Best Band: Thirty Seconds to Mars
 Best Talent Show Artist: Marco Carta
 Italians do it Better: Modà
 TRL History Award: Zero Assoluto
 First Lady Award: Nina Zilli

2012 
For the second time, the show was broadcast from Florence.
 Best Look: Justin Bieber
 Best MTV Show: I soliti idioti
 Best New Generation: Emis Killa
 Best New Artist: Danna Paola
 Wonder Woman Award: Laura Pausini
 Superman Award: Marco Mengoni
 Best Band: Modà
 Italians do it better: Emma Marrone
 Best Fans: Big Bang
 Best Tormentone: Michel Teló – "Ai se eu te pego!"
 Best Video: LMFAO featuring Lauren Bennett and GoonRock – "Party Rock Anthem"
 MTV History Award: Subsonica

2013 
For the third time, the show was broadcast from Florence.
 Air Action Vigorsol Super Man: Marco Mengoni
 Mirabilandia Best MTV Show: Ginnaste - vite parallele
 Best Tweet: Justin Bieber
 Wonder Woman: Emma
 Best Band: One Direction
 Instavip: Fedez
 LG Twitstar: Emis Killa
 Most Clicked Video: "Call Me Maybe" Lip Dub
 Sport Hero: Carlotta Ferlito
 Best Fan: One Direction – Directioners
 Best Video: Danna Paola – "Aguita"
 Best Hashtag: #italialovesemilia
 Pepsi Best New Artist: Baby K
 Best Energic Video: will.i.am featuring Justin Bieber – "#thatPOWER"
 Best Female Artist from Latin America: Danna Paola
 Best Movie: The Twilight Saga: Breaking Dawn – Part 2
 MTV Rock Icon: Gianna Nannini
 Artist Saga: Marco Mengoni

2014 
For the fourth time in a row, the show was broadcast from Florence.
 Superman: Emis Killa
 Best MTV Show: Il testimone
 Twitstar: Marco Mengoni
 Wonder Woman: Alessandra Amoroso
 Best Band: One Direction
 Vogue Eyewear Best Look: Danna Paola
 Diadora Best Dance Crew: Break Da Beat
 Sport Hero: Carlotta Ferlito
 Crodino Twist Best New Generation: Diodato
 Sammontana Best Fan: Marco Mengoni
 Best New Artist: Rocco Hunt
 Best Performance: Michele Bravi
 Best Video: Pharrell Williams – "Happy"
 Best Movie: The Hunger Games: Catching Fire
 Best Artist from the World: Super Junior
 MTV History Award: Giorgia
 Artist Saga: Marco Mengoni

2015 
For the fifth time in a row, the show was broadcast from Florence.
 TIM Best New Generation: Santa Margaret
 Best Movie: The Fault in Our Stars
 Top Instagram Star: Justin Bieber
 Best Tormentone: Ellie Goulding "Love Me Like You Do"
 Best Twitstar: Demi Lovato
 MTV Awards Star: Lady Gaga
 Best Artist From The World: Tokio Hotel
 Superman: Marco Mengoni
 Best New Artist: Lorenzo Fragola
 Artist Saga: Marco Mengoni
 Wonder Woman: Alessandra Amoroso
 Pick Up! Best MTV Show: Mario
 Italian Icon J-Ax
 S'AGAPÕ Best Look: Rihanna
 Best Fan: Avril Lavigne
 Best Band: Dear Jack
 Best Video: Tiziano Ferro "Senza scappare mai più"
 Fanta WebStar: iPantellas

2016 
For the sixth time in a row, the show was broadcast from Florence.
 TIM Best New Generation: Benji & Fede
 Best Movie: The Hunger Games: Mockingjay – Part 2
 Webstar: Alberico De Giglio
 Best Tormentone: Justin Bieber "Sorry"
 Air Vigorsol Best Fresh Video: Justin Bieber "What Do You Mean?"
 MTV Awards Star: Avril Lavigne
 Best Artist From The World: Big Bang
 Best New Artist: Benji & Fede
 Best Italian Male: Marco Mengoni
 Best Italian Female: Emma
 Best International Band: One Direction
 Best International Male: Justin Bieber
 Best International Female: Ariana Grande
 Best Look: Gigi Hadid
 Best MTV New Generation: Jarvis
 Nickelodeon Slimefest Award: Benji & Fede
 Artist Saga: Britney Spears
 Best Fan: One Direction
 Best Performance: The Kolors
 MTV History Award: The Kolors
 MTV Video Awards: Negramaro

2017 
After six years in Florence, the broadcast moved to Rome for the first time. 
 MTV Awards Star: Benji & Fede
 MTV Rap Icon: Fabri Fibra
 MTV History Award: Paola Turci 
 Best Fan: Marco Mengoni 
 Best International Male: Justin Bieber
 Best Artist From The World: Enrique Iglesias 
 Best International Band: One Direction
 Best Italian Band: Benji & Fede
 Mentos White Always Best Look & Smile: Rihanna
 Best International Female: Ariana Grande 
 Best Italian Female: Emma]
 MTV Music Award: Sfera Ebbasta
 Best Video: The Chainsmokers feat. Halsey – "Closer"
 Webstar: Alberico De Giglio 
 Best Italian Male: Marco Mengoni
 Best Performance: Michele Bravi 
 Artist Saga: Fifth Harmony
 Best New Artist: Ermal Meta

References

External links 
 Official Site
 MTV Italy
 TRL Italy Official Fanclub 
 MTV-TMF AWARD 2008(Video)

Italian music awards